Pierre Esser (Turkish: Cengiz Dülgeroğlu; born 4 December 1970) is a German former professional footballer who played as a goalkeeper. He now works as a financial service provider to footballers.

Career
Esser started his senior career with Viktoria Köln. In 1996, he signed for Galatasaray, where he made one appearance. After that, he played for German club SV Eintracht Trier 05 before retiring in 1999.

References

External links 
 Der Herr der Zahlen 
 Pierre Esser 
 "Für ihn sind hier alle Türen zu!" 
 

Living people
1970 births
German people of Turkish descent
German footballers
Association football goalkeepers
FC Viktoria Köln players
Fortuna Düsseldorf players
Galatasaray S.K. footballers
SV Eintracht Trier 05 players
German expatriate footballers
German expatriate sportspeople in Turkey
Expatriate footballers in Turkey